The Old-Time Gospel Hour was a ministry program television broadcast from Thomas Road Baptist Church hosted by minister Jerry Falwell featuring the church's Sunday service. Started in 1956 by Jerry Falwell, The Old-Time Gospel Hour gained a national following on both radio and television. The series was a major fundraising source for Falwell, bringing in over $90 million dollars in the early 1980s. The show's popularity continued through the 1990s, during which time it was still broadcast on hundreds of stations across the country.

The television show as it was known ended in 2007 following the death of Jerry Falwell. His son, Jonathan Falwell, became the primary minister featured in the Sunday services and eventually folded the show into the church's online video library and livestream website called Thomas Road On Demand.

In popular culture
Bono of the band U2 mentions The Old-Time Gospel Hour in the 1988 live version of the song "Bullet the Blue Sky" on the album Rattle and Hum.  Toward the end of the song, there is a spoken section where he says "...and I can't tell the difference between ABC News, Hill Street Blues, and a preacher on the Old-Time Gospel Hour stealing money from the sick and the old. Well the God I believe in isn't short of cash, mister."

References

External links

Television series about Christianity
Jerry Falwell